The Milan–Verona high-speed railway is an Italian  long high-speed railway line, that is partly open and partly under construction to connect Milan with Verona. The route operates through the regions of Lombardy and Veneto. The line is part of Railway axis 6 of the Trans-European rail network (TEN-T) on the Pan-European Corridor V. The line will replace the Milan–Venice railway for high-speed trains.

In 2007, the first phase of construction was completed and opened, between Milan Lambrate and Treviglio. In 2016, the second phase between Treviglio and Brescia was completed. Construction of the remaining section to Verona is still in progress; it is expected to be completed in 2022 or 2023. High speed trains travel on the new line until Brescia, then move to the conventional line for the remaining section.

The stretch to be built between Milan and Verona will measure a total of around 165 kilometers. The route will pass through 31 municipalities in Lombardy and 4 in Veneto.

Construction
The project between Milan and Treviglio was approved in 1995. The connection between the Lambrate station in Milan and the station Pioltello-Limito was completed in 2000, while the section to Treviglio was opened on 10 June 2007. The line has a total of just under thirty kilometers long and has cost just under €290 million.

The final design of the stretch Treviglio - Brescia was approved by CIPE in November 2007 with funding from the Economic Financial Planning Document (DPEF) between 2007 and 2011 of €2.05 billion. An agreement was signed between Rete Ferroviaria Italiana and Cepav Due to the start of work on the first construction lot of this on 7 March 2011, to the value of €700 million. Work began in May 2012 and was completed in 2016.

The railway signaling along the route of the line in operation is the same as on most of the conventional lines, while that of the under construction section will feature ERTMS/ETCS, which ensures interoperability between the European rail lines.

Testing of the section Treviglio-Brescia began in August 2016, with the line opening for passenger service later that year.

The route
Leaving Milan Centrale station, the railway shares a common route with conventional tracks to Milan Lambrate station. After leaving Lambrate, it branches off east towards the mainline to Verona and Bergamo. At Melzo (near Pozzuolo station), the high-speed line divides from the historical route west of Treviglio station. This junction at Treviglio West will enable connection of the currently separate Treviglio and Treviglio Ovest stations.

The project approved by the CIPE involves the construction of a new high-speed, high capacity railway that will bypass to the south of the city of Bergamo to reach Brescia along a line that is mostly separate from the conventional line.

The new track will branch from the future junction at Treviglio West to follow the A35 motorway to the municipality of Castrezzato. From this location, at the completion of the railway line up to Verona, there will be a branch to Brescia West junction, joining with the conventional route. This junction will join the conventional line near Ospitaletto to arrive at the station of Brescia. Commercial operation of trains is scheduled for December 2016, at the start of the 2016–2017 timetable.

The section of the Brescia Est – Verona high speed track has been approved in 2016 and construction started with a projected opening in 2023. This section of the high speed rail will be alongside the A4 Milan-Venice motorway and the conventional railway line. It crosses the Lombardy and Veneto Regions, 11 municipalities within the provinces of Brescia, Verona and Mantua (the latter only for road work purposes) and foresees for the construction of a railway track extending approximately 48 kilometres, including 2.2 kilometres for the Verona Merci interconnection linking the Verona-Brenner railway axis.

The Verona- Padua line is divided into three lots of which the first lot between Verona and Bivio di Vicenza started construction in 2021 and is expected to open in 2027. This first section will run for 44.2 km across 13 municipalities, quadrupling the existing railway. The Verona-Padua project’s construction is valued at a combined total of approximately 4.8bn euros (5.86bn USD). At 76.5 kilometres in length, the railway will serve as an important link across Italy’s northeast.

See also 
 List of railway lines in Italy

References
This article is based upon a translation of the Italian language version as at January 2016.

High-speed railway lines in Italy
High-speed railway lines under construction
Railway lines in Lombardy
Railway lines in Veneto
Proposed railway lines in Italy